Christian Moser may refer to:
 Christian Moser (ski jumper)
 Christian Moser (mathematician)